GS Prosotsani is a football club based in Prosotsani, Greece.  It was founded in 1970.In 2007 they managed to gain promotion to National C Division (Football League 2 or Gamma Ethniki). They were relegated in 2008.

There is also a fan club, Eftixismenoi Mazi, which supports the team. It was founded in 1995.

External links
 Official Website

Football clubs in Eastern Macedonia and Thrace
1970 establishments in Greece
Drama (regional unit)